John James Grady (1923 – 18 April 1986) is an Australian author and academic.

While a senior lecturer at the Newcastle College of Advanced Education in Newcastle, New South Wales, he wrote two text books for social science students.

Bibliography
 It Didn't Just Happen, Cassell Australia, Melbourne, 1974
 A Country Grows Up: Australia in the making, Cassell Australia, Melbourne, 1975  
 "The Manufacture and Consumption of Child Abuse as an Issue". Telos 56 (Summer 1983). New York: Telos Press.

References

1923 births
20th-century Australian non-fiction writers
1986 deaths